The Swedish Code of Statutes (SFS) is the official law code of Sweden which contains the statutes and ordinances enacted and designated by the Government, including a publication of all new Swedish laws enacted by the Riksdag. Every law shall be cited an SFS number, including legislation amending already existing law. The number contained in the citation consists of a four digit year, a colon and then an incrementing number by year. For instance, the Instrument of Government is SFS 1974:152, with each amendment having its own SFS number. The amendments are usually referred to as (year:number) in the main law text.

Unlike most continental European countries, however, Sweden's codified statutes do not include a comprehensive Civil Code comparable to the German BGB or the French Civil Code and instead set forth statutory law in a piecemeal fashion. For example, rather than addressing the law of obligations in one major title of a comprehensive civil code, Sweden addresses the subset of the law of obligations pertaining to torts in an isolated statute passed piecemeal in 1972 that is not itself comprehensive or complete. Similarly, Sweden's contract act just addresses selected topics in contract law leaving the rest to case law, rather than comprehensively addressing all facets of contract law as a civil code on the subject would. In other words, Swedish statutes are more similar in character to statutes in the United States and other Commonwealth nations than to the comprehensive civil codes that predominate in continental European civil law systems and similar systems in Asia and Latin America based upon the continental European civil law systems.

The Swedish Code of Statutes is enacted into statutory law, but is enacted into its own unified legal code, which contains all of the laws enacted by the Swedish government, and includes the criminal law, criminal procedure, government regulations, legal information, civil law, agriculture, and many other major topic areas and subject matter that are important to the development and society of Sweden. The code is derived into positive law, with a mix of statutory law and civil law, and is amended from time to time. It also contains the Constitution of Sweden.

References

External links
 Svensk författningssamling, the official website of SFS
 Regeringskansliet's law database
 SFS in book format from Regeringskansliet

Law of Sweden
Legal codes